Shenze County is a county of Hebei Province, North China, it is under the administration of the prefecture-level city of Shijiazhuang, the provincial capital.

Administrative divisions
Towns:
Shenze Town, Tiegan

Townships:
Baizhuang Township, Liucun Township, Zhaoba Township, Qiaotou Township

Climate

References

External links

County-level divisions of Hebei
Shijiazhuang